The 2020–21 FC Ufa season was the Ufa's seventh successive season in the Russian Premier League, the highest tier of association football in Russia, and seventh in total.

Season events
On 7 October, Vadim Evseev left his role as Head Coach of Ufa by mutual consent, with Rashid Rakhimov being anointed as his replacement on 11 October.

On 3 April, Rashid Rakhimov resigned as Head Coach of Ufa. On 9 April, Aleksei Stukalov was announced as Ufa's new permanent Head Coach on a contract until June 2023.

Squad

Out on loan

Transfers

In

Loans in

Out

Loans out

Released

Competitions

Overview

Premier League

League table

Results summary

Results by round

Results

Russian Cup

Round of 32

Knockout stages

Squad statistics

Appearances and goals

|-
|colspan="14"|Players away from the club on loan:

|-
|colspan="14"|Players who appeared for Ufa but left during the season:

|}

Goal scorers

Clean sheets

Disciplinary record

References

FC Ufa seasons
Ufa